Cele is both a surname and a given name. Notable people with the name include:

Surname:
 Bheki Cele (born 1952), South African politician
 Clara Germana Cele, South African
 Henry Cele (1949–2007), South African actor 
 Siboniso Cele (born 1985), South African canoeist 

Given name:
 Cele Abba (1906–1992), Italian actress

Zulu-language surnames